Cyhra is a Swedish heavy metal supergroup formed in 2017. The band is made up of lead vocalist Joacim "Jake E" Keelyn (ex-Amaranthe), rhythm guitarist Jesper Strömblad (ex-In Flames), the German drummer Alex Landenburg (Kamelot, ex-Annihilator, ex-Axxis), and the Finnish lead guitarist Euge Valovirta (ex-Shining).

Members

Current members
 Jake E – lead vocals (2017–present)
 Jesper Strömblad – rhythm guitar, keyboards (2017–present), bass (2018–present)
 Alex Landenburg – drums (2017–present)
 Euge Valovirta – lead guitar, backing vocals (2017–present), bass (2018–present)

Live members
 "Mr. ASUS" – bass (2019–present)
 Marcus Sunesson – guitar (2019-present)

Former members
 Peter Iwers – bass (2017–2018)

Discography

Studio albums 
 Letters to Myself (2017)
 No Halos in Hell (2019)

Singles 
 "Karma" (2017)
 "Letter to Myself" (2017)
 "Heartrage" (2018)
 "Here to Save You" (2018)
 "Forever" (2018)
 "Out of My Life" (2019)
 "Battle from Within" (2019)
 "Ready to Rumble" (2022)

References

External links
CyHra official website

2017 establishments in Sweden
Swedish hard rock musical groups
Swedish heavy metal musical groups
Musical groups established in 2017
Musical groups from Gothenburg
Musical quintets